Jabal Usam is a sub-district located in al-Saddah District, Ibb Governorate, Yemen. Jabal Usam had a population of 4814 according to the 2004 census.

References 

Sub-districts in As Saddah District